Morrumbene District is a district of Inhambane Province in south-east Mozambique. Its principal town is Morrumbene. The district is located at the east of the province and borders with Massinga District in the north, Homoine District in the south, and with Funhalouro District in the west. In the east, the district is bounded by the Indian Ocean. In terms of the area, this is the biggest district of Inhambane Province. It has a population of 124,471 .

Geography
There are six small rivers in the district which flow throughout the whole year.

History
In colonial times, the area was known as Rumba-Nyone, which was later transformed into Morrumbene.

Demographics
As of 2005, 42% of the population of the district was younger than 15 years. 50% did speak Portuguese. The population was predominantly speaking Chopi language. 53% were analphabetic, mostly women.

Administrative divisions
The district is divided into two postos, Mocodoene and Morrumbene, which in total include six localities.

Economy
In 2005, 1% of the households in the district had electricity.

Agriculture
In 2005, the district had 27,000 farms exploiting on average the area of  each. The main agricultural products are maize, cassava, cowpea, peanuts, sweet potatoes, cotton, and rice.

Transportation
The main national road, EN1, crosses the eastern part of the district, passing the town of Morrumbene.

References

Districts in Inhambane Province